Sywnthkrawft is a synth group from Borlänge, Sweden. They started playing in 2005 and have released 1 album, 3 singles and 2 live-albums. Their music have been described to sound like "electronic space-romance" and "ambient movie score music", but they’ve changed genre to more synth oriented music.

Some artists that have inspired the music of Sywnthkrawft are Kraftwerk, Depeche Mode and Ralph Lundsten.

Biography

2005 : Pre-Cornea Era
William Johansson, Daniel Thyberg, Gustav Jacobsson and Viktor Jacobsson created the band in the summer of 2005, after long discussions of starting a band. The first recordings were of a session of improvised playing. Three songs were recorded from this session, "Das Piraten auf der Mondlicht", "Das Überman Ist Spät" and "Der Kalinka".

After some sessions of only improvised music William Johansson and Daniel Thyberg started to write and record songs (Later, some of these songs would feature on their first album Cornea). One of these songs, called "Approaching Atmosphere" was considered to be released on single. The band even recorded a music video to the track, one problem was that only three of the four members were featured in the video which made some confusion of their line-up.

After some recording sessions the band was ready to release their first album called "Die Autobahn auf Earth". But the material was to badly recorded (most of the tracks were recorded live in the studio with only a microphone in the middle) and then the idea of releasing this material was turned down. But it would later turn out that most of these songs ended up on their soon to come album Cornea (but then rerecorded and remade).

A video where Sywnthkrawft played most materials live in their studio was recorded. This video footage was later destroyed and cannot be restored again. The only known songs that were recorded on the video was "Approaching Atmosphere", "Das Piraten auf der Mondlicht", "Making Adjustments", "Space" and "Armageddon Apocalypse" (which is the only song whom could be restored from the destroyed footage).

2006 : Cornea Era
In the beginning of 2006 William Johansson decided to review the recorded material from the previous year and decided to remake the best songs. So the band gathered again to re-record their old songs with much better equipment than before. The sound became much more atmospheric and ambient than before. The old single "Approaching Atmosphere" would become one of the opening tracks of the album. The recordings took almost three months to become ready. It also took another month to get everything mastered, by Geoff Swartz. The album was going to be called "Cornea".

The album got a pretty neutral reception from the critics. Some called the music “electronic space-romance” and “surreal, ambient and some kind of electronica”. The epic track "Night Flight" and "S.A.Z.A." were considered to be the best songs on the album while "Children" was considered to be the worst song by far.

Following the release of the album a live show was about to take place. A lot of songs were rehearsed and not only songs from the new album but also other songs, even old tracks from the first recording sessions. William Johansson and Daniel Thyberg even wrote lyrics to some of their songs. The ones that got lyrics were "The Greeting", "Extermination", "Das Piraten auf der Mondlicht" and "Grace from Space" (the two mentioned first were two tracks from the early days of Sywnthkrawft). There were also rumours that the controversial song "Afrika" was rehearsed, but that’s not confirmed.

At the time of the concert only one in the band (William) had a keyboard so Gustav Jacobsson and Viktor Jacobsson had to borrow two keyboards while Daniel Thyberg played electric guitar. The concert didn’t go very good, mostly because of technical problems. The critics said that the concert were "horrible" and "a waste of time". The positive response were that the songs, who were from the album Cornea, were heavily rearranged and that the new songs were pretty decent. The best received track was a new song called “Hypernova”.

Another problem according to the band was that their songs were to long and monotonous. The well received songs were those who are not featured on the album. The same day a live-album, called "Chaos at Caoz", was released in very few numbers, and is almost impossible to find today. Also a new single was released, "Making Adjustments". A new music video was made and the b-side was the live performance of "Hypernova". The single got a very cold reception because the critics didn’t want Sywnthkrawft to succeed after their horrible concert.

They went back into the studio and recorded some songs (most notably "Spaceblades", "Rings of Saturn" and a remake of an old song from one of the first session recordings called "Paul Newman"). A setlist were also made for a new concert where the most notably material was a new version of "Night Flight" and a new song called "Saguaroxx". After these recordings and the concert the band withdrew and stopped making music for a while.

2006-Present : Spaceblade Era
After a time of absence William and Daniel came together and tried to write some new songs but only came up with one, "Erecto Plasma". Later William wrote some new songs himself but also revived some of the songs they recorded before their withdrawal. A new EP was made of five songs. But this EP was never released and William went back to the studio to write more songs.

After an absence Daniel decided to leave the group. But William, Gustav and Viktor kept playing and creating new music. The group decided to release a new album called "Goodbye, Spaceblade" and they started to create more tracks. One of these tracks, "The Photographer’s Exceptional Pictures for Body and Mind", was released as a single and gained some fame and controversy.

Later they competed in a competition called Garagerocken 2006 where they ended tied for 4th place (A live album of the show was released, "Tuxedo Junction"). The new studio album was supposed to be released in late 2006, but after problems with finding a producer, the release had to be postponed to May 2007. The style of music was a huge step away from their latest album, "Cornea". All of the songs on the new album are written by William Johansson.

At the beginning of 2007 they competed in Musik Direkt where a jury didn't qualify them to the final. After the announcement, the audience showed their dissatisfaction of the result by sending mails to the arrangers and complaining on different forums on the Internet. Many thought they should’ve got a wild card to the final.

They gained some fame & controversy for their single "The Photographer’s Exceptional Pictures for Body and Mind". On 8 March 2007, it debuted on #1 in the Swedish chart Dalatoppen. They’re known for playing a mix of non-album songs and songs featured on different releases on their live concerts. They also use an exclusive pre-recorded text read by radio and television celebrity Hans Villius as introduction to their concerts.

During the summer of 2007 they’ve decided to take a two-month break from performing and instead William has started to work with remakes of all the songs they used to perform live. Rumors say that all the songs on "Goodbye, Spaceblade" were remade and might end up as an album. William has also started to work on new material for a new Sywnthkrawft album with the working title "SK3 The Space Musical".

Discography

Studio albums

Singles

External links
Official homepage
Myspace page

Swedish musical groups
Artists from Dalarna